is a Japanese cross-country skier. He competed in the men's 15 kilometre event at the 1984 Winter Olympics.

References

1960 births
Living people
Japanese male cross-country skiers
Olympic cross-country skiers of Japan
Cross-country skiers at the 1984 Winter Olympics
Sportspeople from Aomori Prefecture